NC17 (stylized in all lowercase) is the debut album by Treble Charger released on July 4, 1994. It was re-released by Sonic Unyon in 1997. "Red" from this album was also re-recorded for Maybe It's Me. The album is named after the band's original name, before they changed it due to copyright issues with an American band having the same name.

Treble Charger also recorded a demo tape named NC17, with a number of tracks found on the album, but also included was a song named "Barcelona Chair". The Artwork features the Smokin' Worm of Smokin' Worm records.

Track listing
All songs written by Treble Charger.

"10th Grade Love" – 4:04
"In Your Way" – 3:37
"Trinity Bellwoods" – 4:31
"Dress" – 3:28
"Cubicle" – 4:41
"Popcorn Chicken" – 1:37
"Red" – 5:10
"Soaker" – 3:54
"Deception Made Simple" – 4:18
"Pilot Light" – 4:44
"Hint" – 19:00

Credits
Treble Charger - producer, artwork
Greig Nori    - guitar, vocals
Bill Priddle  - guitar, vocals
Rosie Martin  - bass guitar, backing vocals
Morris Palter     - drums, percussion
Joao Carvalho      - mastering
Chris Jackson      - artwork
Rob Sanzo          - producer, engineer

References

1994 debut albums
Treble Charger albums
Sonic Unyon Records albums